The Book of Prefaces, is a 2000 book "edited and glossed" by the Scottish artist and novelist Alasdair Gray. It seeks to provide a history of how literature spread and developed through the nations of England, Ireland, Scotland, and the United States. Its subtitle A Short History of Literate Thought in Words by Great Writers of Four Nations from the 7th to the 20th Century outlines its scope.

Gray's own preface begins with "An Editor's Advertisement" which cites William Smellie's preface to The Philosophy of Natural History published in Edinburgh in 1790 stating what every preface should contain, and concluding that "If this plan had been universally observed, a collection of prefaces would have exhibited a short, but curious and useful history both of literature and authors." In his postscript Gray recounts how reading this in the early 1980s inspired the plan of the book, and after sixteen years on the project (while also producing his other works) the book was completed.

Characteristically, illustrations and design of the typography are by Gray himself, producing a "gorgeously realised" volume. The body of the book provides the prefaces, prologues, introductions or forewords chronologically, each headed with its title, and the year in very large numerals, with commentary by Gray and thirty other writers (including Angus Calder, Alan Spence, Robert Crawford, Bruce Leeming, and Paul Henderson Scott) in small red italic text in a column to the outer side of the leaf as needed to discuss the document. The effect is rather like an annotated Bible.

Reception 
Of the reviews cited on the back cover of the paperback version, the Palo Alto Daily News comments that "The diversity of the selection is staggering. It manages to be serious, accurate and instructive, but is also an amusing text, quixotic and deeply moving".

Joseph Rosenblum noted some oddities and flaws:

Nicholas Lezard begins by remarking on the omission of Thomas Dekker, but continues:

Ian Sansom, reviewing the book (like Lezard) for The Guardian, states that its "affiliations are with the tradition of the commonplace book, with the 18th-century dictionary makers, with the Victorian encyclopaedists, with the Everymans, the Observers, and with H G Wells's The Outline of History. It is egalitarian in ambition and aristocratic in execution." Sansom adds, "Unconsidered trifles include John Clare's unstopped intro to "The Parish" (1827) - 'THIS POEM was begun & finished under the pressure of heavy distress with embittered feelings under a state of anxiety and oppression almost amounting to slavery'. In addition, there are prefaces to these prefaces, glosses and introductions, and not all of them written by Gray (the book makes strange bedfellows, among others, of James Kelman and Roger Scruton)."

Peter A. Dollard, in Library Journal, said, "This long-anticipated book from a major figure in the Scottish literary revival lives up to expectations. A delightfully original, ironic, and humorous compilation, it aims to include every major introductory essay in the English language from Cædmon (seventh century) up to the early 20th century. A red gloss runs down the side of most pages, providing fascinating and often idiosyncratic commentary. The reader learns, for example, that in John Gay's day thieves were likely to hang 'unless, like the most successful thieves, they could hire lawyers.' Gray ... was assisted by some 30 contributors, who wrote about 20 percent of the commentary."

See also
 Scots language

References

Further reading
 Quinn, Mary Ellen. "Reference Books in Brief". Booklist. October 2000. Vol. 97, Issue 3, p. 374.
 Schillinger, Liesl. "Let Us Now Praise Famous Books". The New Yorker. September 11, 2000. Vol. 76, Issue 26, p. 26.
 Schwarz, Benjamin. "The Book of Prefaces". The Atlantic Monthly. March 2003, Vol. 291, Issue 2, p. 96.

2000 non-fiction books
Scottish non-fiction literature
21st-century history books
Books of literary criticism
History books about literature